Lyelliceras is a genus of ammonites belonging to the family Lyelliceratidae. These cephalopods were fast-moving nektonic carnivores. They lived in the Cretaceous period, Albian stage (109.0 to 99.7 Ma).

Etymology 
The genus has been named after geologist Charles Lyell.

Description 
They are moderately to very evolute. The section of the whorls is slightly compressed or circular, with straight radial ribs.

Species 
The following species have been recognised:
Lyelliceras escragnollensis 
Lyelliceras latili 
Lyelliceras lyelli 
Lyelliceras pseudolyelli 
Lyelliceras vaasti

Distribution 
Fossils of species within this genus have been found in the Cretaceous sediments of Colombia (Hiló Formation, Tolima), France, Madagascar, Mexico, Peru, South Africa, United Kingdom, United States and Venezuela.

References 

Ammonitida genera
Acanthoceratoidea
Cretaceous ammonites
Ammonites of Africa
Cretaceous Africa
Ammonites of Europe
Cretaceous France
Ammonites of North America
Cretaceous Mexico
Cretaceous United States
Ammonites of South America
Cretaceous Colombia
Cretaceous Peru
Cretaceous Venezuela
Albian life
Fossil taxa described in 1921
Albian genus extinctions